Ōtorohanga District is a territorial municipality in the King Country area and Waikato region of the North Island of New Zealand. It is a mostly rural area, with Ōtorohanga town being by far the biggest urban area, with a population nearing 3,000. The District was called Otorohanga County from 1971 to 1979.

Geography
Ōtorohanga District is located south of Hamilton, west of Rotorua, and northwest of Taupō. It stretches from Kawhia Harbour on the west coast inland to the Pureora Forest Park. Adjacent local government districts are (clockwise from the north) Waikato, Waipa, South Waikato, Taupo, and Waitomo. It is a mostly rural area, with significant areas of native forest.

History
After the land wars, the wider area of the King Country was a refuge for Tāwhiao, the second Māori King, and his followers. From 1864 to 1883, pākehā (white settlers) were not allowed into the area unless they had express permission. The district was used for farming from the late 19th century onwards.

The first municipal government, Otorohanga County, was formed in 1922. In 1956, the northern part of Kawhia County and Otorohanga County were amalgamated. On 1 November 1971, Otorohanga Borough was subsumed into Otorohanga County. The Otorohanga District was declared in 1979 by renaming Otorohanga County. It was reconstituted as part of the 1989 local government reforms, with a nearly identical area.

Governance

The seat of Ōtorohanga District Council is in the town of Ōtorohanga. The council is headed by a mayor, and complemented by seven councillors from five wards. The council wards are Kawhia/Tihiroa (two councillors), Waipa, Wharepuhunga, Kiokio/ Korakonui, and Ōtorohanga (two councillors). Max Baxter has been the mayor since the 2013 local elections.

The District is entirely within the wider Waikato Regional Council area.

Demographics
Other communities include Hauturu, Honikiwi, Kawhia, Maihiihi, Oparau, Otewa, Owhiro, Puketotara, Te Kawa and Wharepuhunga.

Ōtorohanga District had a population of 10,104 at the 2018 New Zealand census, an increase of 963 people (10.5%) since the 2013 census, and an increase of 1,029 people (11.3%) since the 2006 census. There were 3,498 households, comprising 5,292 males and 4,812 females, giving a sex ratio of 1.1 males per female. The median age was 36.3 years (compared with 37.4 years nationally), with 2,283 people (22.6%) aged under 15 years, 1,926 (19.1%) aged 15 to 29, 4,416 (43.7%) aged 30 to 64, and 1,479 (14.6%) aged 65 or older.

Ethnicities were 77.5% European/Pākehā, 30.0% Māori, 2.2% Pacific peoples, 4.0% Asian, and 1.5% other ethnicities. People may identify with more than one ethnicity.

The percentage of people born overseas was 11.2, compared with 27.1% nationally.

Although some people chose not to answer the census's question about religious affiliation, 55.5% had no religion, 30.7% were Christian, 1.9% had Māori religious beliefs, 1.0% were Hindu, 0.3% were Muslim, 0.5% were Buddhist and 2.2% had other religions.

Of those at least 15 years old, 918 (11.7%) people had a bachelor's or higher degree, and 1,896 (24.2%) people had no formal qualifications. The median income was $30,200, compared with $31,800 nationally. 1,005 people (12.9%) earned over $70,000 compared to 17.2% nationally. The employment status of those at least 15 was that 3,984 (50.9%) people were employed full-time, 1,266 (16.2%) were part-time, and 279 (3.6%) were unemployed.

References

External links

 Ōtorohanga District Council

 
1979 establishments in New Zealand